Lewi Tonks (1897–1971) was an American quantum physicist noted for his discovery (with Marvin D. Girardeau) of the Tonks–Girardeau gas.

Tonks was employed by General Electric for most of his working life, researching microwaves and ferromagnetism.  He worked under Irving Langmuir on plasma physics, with a special interest in ball lightning, nuclear fusion, tungsten filament light bulbs, and lasers.

Tonks advocated a logarithmic pressure scale for vacuum technology to replace the torr.

Tonks was notable for his high ethical standards and concern with social problems.  Several times, he put up bail money for people who could not afford to do so. He provided career counselling for the poor, and after retiring from GE worked as a volunteer for the Schenectady Human Rights Commission. He also campaigned on Vietnam war issues. In 1934, he ran for the U.S. House of Representatives from New York's 30th congressional district as a member of the Socialist Party, earning 2.5% of the vote. He ran again in 1936, winning 1.9%.

Death and professional papers
In July 1971, Tonks died of a heart attack at the age of seventy-four.  He left his wife Edna and three children, Mary Lew, Joan and Bruce L. Tonks.

After his death, his collected papers containing correspondence, both personal and professional, research notes, drafts of papers and completed research papers from 1930's to the 1960s passed to his wife. Shortly thereafter, the collection was deposited at the Niels Bohr Library of the American Institute of Physics in College Park, Maryland.

See also
Plasma oscillation
ZETA (fusion reactor)

External links
 https://web.archive.org/web/20041214062739/http://www.aip.org/history/esva/catalog/esva/Tonks_Lewi.html
 https://web.archive.org/web/20050217184515/http://www.aip.org/history/ead/aip_tonks/20030130.html

1897 births
1971 deaths
20th-century American physicists
Quantum physicists
Fellows of the American Physical Society